Phos gemmulifer is a species of sea snail, a marine gastropod mollusk in the family Buccinidae, the true whelks.

Description

Distribution
This marine species occurs off Mozambique.

References

 Kilburn R.N. 2000. Description of new species of Phos and Nassarius from south-eastern Africa (Mollusca: Gastropoda: Buccinidae, Nassariidae). Annals of the Natal Museum 41 :203-208
  Steyn, D.G & Lussi, M. (2005). Offshore Shells of Southern Africa: A pictorial guide to more than 750 Gastropods. Published by the authors. Pp. i–vi, 1–289.
 Kilburn R.N., Marais J.P. & Fraussen K. (2010) Buccinidae. pp. 16–52, in: Marais A.P. & Seccombe A.D. (eds), Identification guide to the seashells of South Africa. Volume 1. Groenkloof: Centre for Molluscan Studies. 376 pp.

External links
 Fraussen, K., Galindo, L.A. & Rosado, J. (2020). Deep-water Photinae (Gastropoda: Nassariidae) from eastern Africa, with descriptions of five new species. European Journal of Taxonomy. 720: 144–169.
 Galindo, L. A.; Puillandre, N.; Utge, J.; Lozouet, P.; Bouchet, P. (2016). The phylogeny and systematics of the Nassariidae revisited (Gastropoda, Buccinoidea). Molecular Phylogenetics and Evolution. 99: 337-353

Nassariidae
Gastropods described in 2000